Sharad Pawar College Of Pharmacy (SPCP: formerly Nagpur College of Pharmacy or NCP) is a pharmacy college in Nagpur, central India. It is approved by All India Council for Technical Education (AICTE) and the Pharmacy Council of India, and is affiliated to Rashtrasant Tukadoji Maharaj Nagpur University. The institute offers bachelor's degrees in pharmacy, Master's degrees of pharmacy, and PhD courses. The institute has recently  engaged in pharmaceutical research sponsored by the Indian Council of Scientific and Industrial Research and AICTE, and has received more than seven research patents.

References

External links 
 

Pharmacy colleges in Maharashtra
Universities and colleges in Nagpur
Science and technology in Nagpur
Educational institutions established in 1984
1984 establishments in Maharashtra